The 2007 World Snowshoe Championships was the 2nd edition of the global snowshoe running competition, World Snowshoe Championships, organised by the World Snowshoe Federation and took place in Schladming, Dachstein Glacier on 6 April 2007.

Results
The race Dachstein Xtreme, held on the distance of 11 km, has compiled two different ranking (male and female) overall, it was the mass start system.

Men's overall

Women's overall

References

External links
 World Snowshoe Federation official web site

World Snowshoe Championships